Ameena case was the 1991 selling  of a 10-year young girl, Ameena from Hyderabad, India, to a person from Saudi Arabia. The child bride was rescued on 10 August 1991 by the air hostess Amrita Ahluwalia when Ameena was being taken to Saudi Arabia. Later it was found Badruddin and his wife Sabira Begum had sold their 10-year-old daughter Ameena into marriage for a reported $240 to a 60-year-old Saudi Arabian. The case unearthed bride shopping in Hyderabad by persons from the Middle East and raised a lot of attention at that time.

In popular culture 
The movie Yahan Ameena Bikti Hai starring Rekha Rana as Ameena was released in 2016 which was based on her real life.

References

Bibliography
 
 

Violence against women in India
Crime in Hyderabad, India
Child abuse in India
Human trafficking in India
History of Andhra Pradesh (1947–2014)
1991 crimes in India
Incidents of violence against girls
Violence against women in Saudi Arabia